Ivindo is a department of Ogooué-Ivindo Province in northern-central Gabon. Its capital is also the province's capital, Makokou. It had a population of 31,073 in 2013.

Towns and villages

References

Ogooué-Ivindo Province
Departments of Gabon